Paul Indrek Kostabi (also known as Ena; born October 1, 1962 in Whittier, California, United States) is an American artist, musician, record producer and audio engineer. He is the brother of artist Mark Kostabi.

Kostabi was a founding member of the bands Youth Gone Mad, White Zombie, and Psychotica. Kostabi currently performs with Tony Esposito in the group Kostabeats and with Walter Schreifels band Dead Heavens.

Kostabi became part of the CBGB Festival in 2014 exhibiting paintings alongside photographers Bob Gruen, Michael Lavine and Chris Stein. He also painted live in Times Square while Devo and Jane's Addiction performed.

Kostabi is credited with naming the painting Use Your Illusion by Mark Kostabi, which became the title for Guns N' Roses studio albums volume 1 and 2.

In 2012, he launched brand Bad Things with artwork on various electronic device covers such as iPhones.

In 2015, Kostabi launches his character sprkl through Gallerie F in Kranenburg at the Art Karlsruhe art fair with a solo exhibition, of paintings sculpture and prints of the character.

In 2016, Kostabi #sprkl character featured in Pokémon GO game.

Also in 2016, Kostabi art featured in Architectural Digest.

Paul Kostabi paintings are present in permanent collections of:
 Paterson Museum, New Jersey
 Guggenheim Museum, New York
 New England Museum of Art, Brooklyn, Connecticut
 Millennium Museum
 Whitney Museum of Art, Video, Paper Tiger Sessions
 Museion Museum, Bolzano, Italy

References

External links
 Thunderdome studios
 Paul Kostabi Williamsport Guardian

American people of Estonian descent
American punk rock musicians
Songwriters from California
Record producers from California
White Zombie (band) members
1962 births
Living people
Musicians from Whittier, California